General elections were held in November and December 1908 for all 288 seats of the Chamber of Deputies of the Ottoman Empire, following the Young Turk Revolution which established the Second Constitutional Era. They were the first elections contested by organised political parties.

Background
The Young Turk Revolution in July resulted in the restoration of the 1876 constitution, ushering in the Second Constitutional Era, and the reconvening of the 1878 parliament, bringing back many of the surviving members of that parliament; the restored parliament's single legislation was a decree to formally dissolve itself and call for new elections.

The Committee of Union and Progress (CUP), the driving force behind the revolution, was in an advantageous position for the election. Because it was still a secret organization, the CUP did not organize itself into a party until well after the elections in its 1909 Congress at Selanik (Thessaloniki).

In the lead up to the election, Prince Sabahattin's  established itself as the Liberty (Ahrar) Party. The Liberty Party was liberal in outlook, bearing a strong British imprint and was closer to the Palace. It hardly had time to organize itself for the election.

Electoral system
The elections were held in two stages. In the first stage, voters elected secondary electors (one for the first 750 voters in a constituency, then one for every additional 500 voters). In the second stage the secondary electors elected the members of the Chamber of Deputies. The CUP was successful in abolishing quotas for non-Muslim populations, by amending the electoral to instead stipulate one deputy to every 50,000 males.

Results
The Committee of Union and Progress, the main driving force behind the revolution, could count on the support of about 60 deputies, gaining the upper hand against the Liberty Party. Many independents were elected to the parliament, mostly from the Arab provinces. The new parliament consisted of 147 Turks, 60 Arabs, 27 Albanians, 26 Greeks, 14 Armenians, 10 Slavs, and four Jews.

Aftermath
Following the electoral victory, the CUP transformed itself from a clandestine organization to a political party. Before that would happen though, Abdulhamid II would attempt to regain his autocracy in what would be known as the 31 March Incident.

See also
3rd Chamber of Deputies of the Ottoman Empire

References

Ottoman
Ottoman
Elections in the Ottoman Empire
Legislative election